Nikola Bagaš, or Nikola Baldovin Bagaš (fl. 1354—1384), was a 14th-century Serbian nobleman from the Bagaš noble family, lord (župan) of Edessa and Trikala. In 1384, before his region would be completely annexed to the Ottoman Empire, Bagaš donated the monastery of Mesonesiotissa near Edessa, together with villages, churches and other property, to the Athonite monastery of Saint Paul (Agiou Pavlou) based on the request of his brother Antonije. In the document made on that occasion Bagaš did not use any title for himself. He was married to the daughter of Radoslav Hlapen and received Voden (modern day Edessa in Greece) a dowry probably around 1366—7. Before 1385, Bagaš became a vassal of the Ottoman sultan Murad I.

Footnotes

References

Sources
 
 
Eastern Christianity Michael Angold

14th-century Serbian nobility
People of the Serbian Empire
Edessa, Greece
Trikala
Nikola